The men's freestyle bantamweight was a freestyle wrestling event held as part of the Wrestling at the 1924 Summer Olympics programme. It was the third appearance of the event. Bantamweight was the lightest category, including wrestlers weighing up to 56 kilograms.

Results
Source: Official results; Wudarski

Gold medal round

Silver medal round

Bronze medal round

References

Wrestling at the 1924 Summer Olympics